Thomas Butler (died 11 November 1923) was an English footballer who played as an inside-left. He played 60 league games in the English Football League, scoring 23 goals. He played for non-league Willenhall, before spending the 1921–22 season at Walsall. He joined Port Vale via Darlaston in December 1922. He broke his arm in a game on 3 November 1923, and died eight days later from a subsequent tetanus infection.

Career
Butler started his career at Birmingham & District League side Willenhall, before joining Walsall in 1921. He played 28 Third Division North games for the "Saddlers" in 1921–22, scoring 12 goals. He then returned to semi-professional football with Darlaston.

He had a one-month trial at Second Division Port Vale in December 1922, and manager Joe Schofield signed him permanently for £100 the following month. Butler was a huge success in the 1922–23 season, becoming top scorer with nine goals in 26 games. At the end of the season he played in a defeat to local rivals Stoke in the North Staffordshire Infirmary Cup.He started 1923–24 by scoring in a defeat to Stoke at The Old Recreation Ground. However, after scoring in a 1–1 draw with Clapton Orient on 3 November he suffered a compound fracture of the left arm; he died from tetanus (also called lockjaw) eight days later in Hackney Hospital after complications had set in. The club paid his widow the rest of his wages, and other clubs donated money to provide his widow with a £700 benefit fund.

Career statistics
Source:

References

Year of birth missing
1923 deaths
People from Darlaston
English footballers
Association football forwards
Willenhall F.C. players
Walsall F.C. players
Darlaston Town F.C. players
Port Vale F.C. players
English Football League players
Deaths from tetanus
Infectious disease deaths in England
Association football players who died while playing
Sport deaths in England